Bimagrumab (BYM338) is a human monoclonal antibody developed by Novartis to treat pathological muscle loss and weakness. On August 20, 2013, it was announced that bimagrumab had received a breakthrough therapy designation for sporadic inclusion body myositis (sIBM) by the US Food and Drug Administration.

In 2014, Bimagrumab entered Phase II development, with some research indicating clinical effects. Novartis planned to apply in 2016 for FDA approval to treat sIBM patients with bimagrumab.

In April 2016, Novartis announced that bimagrumab had failed a Phase IIb/III study for sporadic inclusion body myositis.

In January 2021, a new study confirmed that treatment with Bimagrumab is safe and effective for treating excess adiposity and metabolic disturbances of adult patients with obesity and type 2 diabetes.

References 

Monoclonal antibodies
Novartis brands
Experimental drugs